Glenormiston Airport is located near Glenormiston Station, Queensland, Australia.

See also
 List of airports in Queensland

References

Airports in Queensland